Lewis Fiorini (born 17 May 2002) is a professional footballer who currently plays as a midfielder for  Blackpool, on loan from Manchester City. Born in England, Fiorini represents Scotland at youth international level.

Club career

Manchester City
An attacking midfielder, Fiorini began his career at Manchester City and has progressed through several age groups. On 2 July 2021, he signed a new long-term contract at the club, keeping him at Manchester City until the summer of 2026.

NAC Brada (loan)
On 20 August 2020, Fiorini joined NAC Breda on a season-long loan, during which time he scored six goals and achieved five assists.

Lincoln City (loan)
On 2 July 2021, Fiorini signed a season-long loan at Lincoln City, admitting that he spoke with Manchester City teammate and ex-Lincoln City loanee Morgan Rogers about joining the club. He made his debut on the 10 August, coming off the bench in an EFL Cup tie against Shrewsbury Town which saw the Imps lose on penalties, with Fiorini missing their final one. He scored his first goal for the club, during a 5–1 victory against Cambridge United on 11 September 2021.

Blackpool (loan)
On 16 July 2022, Fiorini joined Blackpool on a season-long loan. He made his debut for the club in a single-goal victory over Reading at Bloomfield Road on 29 July.

Career statistics

Club

Notes

References

2002 births
Living people
English footballers
Scottish footballers
England youth international footballers
Scotland youth international footballers
English people of Scottish descent
English people of Italian descent
English expatriate footballers
Scottish expatriate footballers
Association football midfielders
Manchester City F.C. players
NAC Breda players
Lincoln City F.C. players
Blackpool F.C. players
Eerste Divisie players
English expatriate sportspeople in the Netherlands
Scottish expatriate sportspeople in the Netherlands
Expatriate footballers in the Netherlands
Scottish people of Italian descent
English Football League players